Audience Given by the Trustees of Georgia to a Delegation of Creek Indians is an oil-on-canvas group portrait created by English painter William Verelst (1704–1752). It was painted in London in 1734 or 1735. A bequest from Henry Francis du Pont, the painting is held in the permanent collection of the Winterthur Museum, Garden and Library. The painting depicts a Creek Yamacraw delegation, including Tomochichi, meeting with the governing body of the English Province of Georgia.

Background 
In February 1733, James Oglethorpe and a group of one hundred British colonists arrived at the mouth of the Savannah River, where Tomochichi had led a band of two hundred Creek followers (which became the Yamacraw band) to settle in the late 1720s, far from their ancestral lands in the Chattahoochee River basin. Tomochichi and Oglethorpe quickly established friendly relations that culminated in a treaty of friendship and trade, enabling the British to form the new colony of Georgia. Tomochichi also played an important role in negotiating alliances between Lower Creek communities and the British.

In 1734, a Yamacraw delegation accompanied Oglethorpe to London to meet with the Trustees for the Establishment of the Colony of Georgia in America and other English dignitaries. Oglethorpe hoped that the Indians' presence would attract  greater investments to the colony. During a four-month visit, the delegates met with King George II and Queen Caroline on August 1 and with Georgia's trustees on September 11 before sailing for home in late October. Verelst painted a group portrait of this meeting between the delegates and trustees. The portrait was likely painted from sketches in the months after the visit. Verelst also painted a separate portrait of Tomochichi and his heir.

Description 
In this painting, the English trustees of Georgia Colony meet with a delegation of Creek Indians of the Yamacraw band at the trustees' headquarters in Whitehall. Twenty-four English trustees, wearing the powdered wigs and tailcoats of English gentry, gather on a slightly elevated area on the left side of the image, signifying the formality of the occasion and assumed superiority to their guests. The nine Indian delegates stand on the floor to the right and wear traditional attire of deerskin moccasins and robes, braided hair, and feathered or beaded accessories. Senauki, Tomochichi's wife and the sole woman in the group, wears a pink English-style jacket and petticoats. A black bear cub and a bald eagle are intended as gifts from the Indians that also signify their perceived quality of wildness. Tomochichi, his robe draped over one shoulder, extends an open hand, palm upward, signifying frankness and amity. 

The youth with dark skin, positioned near the center of the painting and clasping the hand of one of the English trustees, is dressed in English formal wear. Mistaken as a "black attendant" by at least one scholar, he is Tooanahowi, the fifteen-year-old heir-designate of Tomochichi. Contemporaries described Tooanahowi as the chief's nephew, but he was actually Senauki's grandson (traditional Creek society was matrilineal). The youth received English schooling, delivered speeches in English during the expedition, and later fought alongside the British in the War of Jenkins' Ear.

The scene is set inside a Late Baroque building with high stone walls, marble-tiled floor, heavy draperies, and brass chandelier with a window giving a view of Westminster Abbey.

Analysis 

The painting is also known as the Common Council of Georgia receiving the Indian Chiefs. Commissioned by Georgia's trustees, it hung in the trustees' offices in London until the trustees dissolved after Georgia became a royal colony in 1752. Anthony Ashley Cooper, 4th Earl of Shaftesbury, acquired the portrait, which stayed in the Cooper family until it was purchased by Henry Francis du Pont circa 1930. The ninth earl presented a copy, painted by Edmund Dyer in 1826, to the State of Georgia in 1926.

Author Donald N. Yates argued that most of the Indian delegates were Cherokees rather than Creeks, including Cherokee leader Attakullakulla. Yates walked back these claims in 2020 after reviewing a high-resolution image from the Winterthur Museum. The Indians' names appear in a cartouche, part of the painting's original frame.

The painting inspired the design of a towering and nearly nude statue of Tomochichi erected in Atlanta in 2022. Historians and members of the Muscogee Nation criticized the statute as historically inaccurate and its source material as "propaganda" intended to portray Native Americans as "weak and uncivilized."

References

External links 

 Information about the painting from Winterthur Museum

1735 paintings
18th-century portraits
English paintings
Group portraits by English artists
Native Americans in art
Oil on canvas paintings
Paintings in Delaware
Portraits by American artists
Portraits of historical figures
Collections of the Winterthur Museum, Garden and Library